France is divided into eighteen administrative regions (singular  ), of which thirteen are located in metropolitan France (in Europe), while the other five are overseas regions (not to be confused with the overseas collectivities, which have a semi-autonomous status). 

All of the thirteen metropolitan administrative regions (including Corsica ) are further subdivided into two to thirteen administrative departments, with the prefect of each region's administrative centre's department also acting as the regional prefect. The overseas regions administratively consist of only one department each and hence also have the status of overseas departments.

Most administrative regions also have the status of regional territorial collectivities, which comes with a local government, with departmental and communal collectivities below the region level. The exceptions are Corsica, French Guiana, Mayotte and Martinique, where region and department functions are managed by single local governments having consolidated jurisdiction and which are known as single territorial collectivities.

History

1982–2015
The term  was officially created by the Law of Decentralisation (2 March 1982), which also gave regions their legal status. The first direct elections for regional representatives took place on 16 March 1986.

Between 1982 and 2015, there were 22 regions in Metropolitan France.  Before 2011, there were four overseas regions (French Guiana, Guadeloupe, Martinique, and Réunion); in 2011 Mayotte became the fifth.

Reform and mergers of regions
In 2014, the French parliament passed a law reducing the number of metropolitan regions from 22 to 13 effective 1 January 2016.

The law gave interim names for most of the new regions by combining the names of the former regions, e.g. the region composed of Aquitaine, Poitou-Charentes and Limousin was temporarily called Aquitaine-Limousin-Poitou-Charentes.  However, the combined region of Upper and Lower Normandy is simply called "Normandy" (Normandie).  Permanent names were proposed by the new regional councils by 1 July 2016 and new names confirmed by the Conseil d'État by 30 September 2016. The legislation defining the new regions also allowed the Centre region to officially change its name to "Centre-Val de Loire" with effect from January 2015.
Two regions, Auvergne-Rhône-Alpes and Bourgogne-Franche-Comté, opted to retain their interim names.

Given below is a table of former regions and which new region they became part of.

List of administrative regions

Role 
Regions lack separate legislative authority and therefore cannot write their own statutory law. They levy their own taxes and, in return, receive a decreasing part of their budget from the central government, which gives them a portion of the taxes it levies. They also have considerable budgets managed by a regional council (conseil régional) made up of representatives voted into office in regional elections.

A region's primary responsibility is to build and furnish high schools. In March 2004, the French central government unveiled a controversial plan to transfer regulation of certain categories of non-teaching school staff to the regional authorities. Critics of this plan contended that tax revenue was insufficient to pay for the resulting costs, and that such measures would increase regional inequalities.

In addition, regions have considerable discretionary power over infrastructural spending, e.g., education, public transit, universities and research, and assistance to business owners. This has meant that the heads of wealthy regions such as Île-de-France or Rhône-Alpes can be high-profile positions.

Proposals to give regions limited legislative autonomy have met with considerable resistance; others propose transferring certain powers from the departments to their respective regions, leaving the former with limited authority.

Regional control 
Number of regions controlled by each coalition since 1986.

Overseas regions 
Overseas region is a recent designation, given to the overseas departments that have similar powers to those of the regions of metropolitan France. As integral parts of the French Republic, they are represented in the National Assembly, Senate and Economic and Social Council, elect a Member of the European Parliament (MEP) and use the euro as their currency.

Although these territories have had these political powers since 1982, when France's decentralisation policy dictated that they be given elected regional councils along with other regional powers, the designation overseas regions dates only to the 2003 constitutional change; indeed, the new wording of the constitution aims to give no precedence to either appellation overseas department or overseas region, although the second is still virtually unused by French media.

The following have overseas region status:

 in the Indian Ocean (Africa):
 Mayotte 
 Réunion 

 in the Americas:
 French Guiana in South America
 Guadeloupe in the Antilles (Caribbean)
 Martinique in the Antilles (Caribbean)

 ^ Saint Pierre and Miquelon (off Canada, in North America), once an overseas department, was demoted to a territorial collectivity in 1985.

See also 

 List of current presidents of the regional councils of France and the Corsican Assembly
 Ranked list of French regions
 Administrative divisions of France
 List of French regions and overseas collectivities by GDP
 List of French regions by Human Development Index
 List of regions of France by population
 Flags of the regions of France
 ISO 3166-2:FR

General:
 Decentralisation in France
 Budget of France
 Regional councils of France
 Administrative divisions of France

 Overseas
 Overseas France
 Clipperton Island
 Overseas collectivity
 Overseas country (Outre-mer)
 Overseas department and region
 Overseas territory
 Sui generis collectivity

Notes

References

External links 
 
 Guide to the regions of France
 Local websites by region
 Will 2010 regional elections lead to political shake-up? Radio France Internationale in English
 Overseas regions
 Ministère de l'Outre-Mer
 some explanations about the past and current developments of DOMs and TOMs (in French)

 
France 1
Regions, France
Regions
Regions
Subdivisions of France
France